Morice Carlos Clarke (23 February 1852 – 14 July 1887) was an English first-class cricketer active from 1875 to 1880 who played for Surrey. He was born in Welton, Northamptonshire, and died in Virginia Water.

References

1852 births
1887 deaths
English cricketers
Surrey cricketers